Puerto Rico Highway 196 (PR-196) is an urban road in Caguas, Puerto Rico. This road goes from PR-156 in Cañabón to PR-1 near Bairoa, and it is known as Avenida José Garrido.

Major intersections

See also

 List of highways numbered 196

References

External links
 

196
Caguas, Puerto Rico